The women's VL2 competition at the 2022 ICF Canoe Sprint World Championships in Dartmouth took place on Lake Banook.

Schedule
The schedule was as follows:

All times are Atlantic Daylight Time (UTC−3)

Results
With fewer than ten competitors entered, this event was held as a direct final.

References

ICF